Kanyon Paul (born 5 October 1997) is a New Zealand rugby league footballer who plays for the New Zealand Warriors in the NRL Women's Premiership.

Background
Born in Hamilton, New Zealand, Paul was a Waikato Rugby Union representative before switching to rugby league.

Playing career
Paul began playing rugby league for the Hamilton City Tigers, where she won a Waikato Rugby League premiership in 2019 alongside New Zealand international Honey Hireme.

On 10 July 2019, Paul joined the New Zealand Warriors NRL Women's Premiership team. In Round 1 of the 2019 NRL Women's season, she made her debut for the Warriors in a 16–12 win over the Sydney Roosters.

In October 2019, she was a member of New Zealand's 2019 Rugby League World Cup 9s-winning squad.

In September 2020, Paul was one of five New Zealand-based Warriors' players to travel to Australia to play in the 2020 NRL Women's premiership. Due to COVID-19 restrictions, the players had to quarantine for 14 days on entering Australia and 14 days on return to New Zealand when the season was completed.

References

External links
NZ Warriors profile

1997 births
Living people
New Zealand female rugby league players
New Zealand Warriors (NRLW) players
Rugby league hookers
Rugby league players from Hamilton, New Zealand